Central Stadium is a multi-use stadium in Vulcan, Hunedoara County. It is the home ground of CSM Mihai Viteazu Vulcan. It can hold 2,000 people.

References

Football venues in Romania
Buildings and structures in Hunedoara County